The Maines Brothers Band is an American, Texas-based country music band. The Maines Brothers for which the band was named are Lloyd Maines (steel, rhythm, and electric guitar, vocals), Donnie Maines (percussion, vocals), Kenny Maines (lead vocals, bass guitar, harmonica), and Steve Maines (lead vocals, rhythm guitar). Other members of the band have included Jerry Brownlow, Randy Brownlow, Cary Banks, Richard Bowden, and LaTronda Maines. Terry Allen has collaborated with the band as well.

The Maines Brothers Band got its start in the mid-1950s with James and Sonny Maines, father and uncle of the Lloyd/Donnie/Kenny/Steve combo that eventually formed the band. The younger group of brothers initially performed as "The Little Maines Brothers Band" before taking over the "Maines Brothers Band" moniker in the mid-1970s. The Maines family lived in and around Lubbock, Texas, and the band was based there.  Several albums and tracks are named after the area, including "Hub City Moan" (1981 album and track) after Lubbock's nickname, the "Hub City";  "Rt. 1 Acuff" (1980 album) after Acuff, Texas, and "Panhandle Dancer" (1982 album) after the Texas Panhandle. In the mid-1980s the band recorded for Mercury/Polygram records and scored a top-20 Country hit in 1985 with "Everybody Needs Love on Saturday Night".

In 1993 the band were inducted into the West Texas Walk of Fame, a group that honors and celebrates those individuals or groups who have an affiliation to Lubbock and the West Texas area and have devoted much of their lives to the development of and/or gained recognition in the promotion or production of the arts, music and entertainment.

The Maines Brothers Band performed a reunion set as an opening act for the Dixie Chicks (whose lead singer Natalie Maines is Lloyd Maines's daughter) at Lubbock's United Spirit Arena on August 6, 2000. They also had reunion concerts at the Lubbock Memorial Civic Center Theatre on April 21, 2007, August 13, 2011, August 24, 2013, and June 25, 2016, and at the Lubbock Memorial Civic Center Exhibit Hall on August 8, 2015.

On December 2, 2022, the band played a concert at The Carol of Lights ceremony at Texas Tech University in celebration of the University's centennial.  The event served as the kick-off for a year long celebration of Texas Tech.  The annual event is estimated to have drawn over 20,000 spectators.

Discography

Albums

Singles

References

Archival materials
 Steve Maines papers, 1964-2015, at Southwest Collection/Special Collections Library, Texas Tech University

Country music groups from Texas
Musical groups from Lubbock, Texas
Mercury Records artists